Stephen Warbrick is an American animator, producer, voice actor and writer. He is one of the co-creators of the American adult animated television series Superjail!, which he created with Christy Karacas and Ben Gruber.

Warbrick began his career, as working at MTV Animation. In 2006, He directed the short film Bar Fight, with his partner, Christy Karacas. Warbrick was also an animator at Blue Sky Studios.

References

External links 

Living people
Year of birth missing (living people)
American television producers
American screenwriters
American producers
American animators
American male voice actors